Darzhavna aeroplanna rabotilnitsa (Държавна аеропланна работилница - State Aircraft Workshops), abbreviated DAR (ДАР), was the first Bulgarian aircraft manufacturer, established in 1924 at Bojourishte.

History
Initially involved in repairing German aircraft then in use in Bulgaria, DAR soon began producing copies of some of these (DAR Uzunov-1, DAR 2), before moving on to licensed production of the Focke-Wulf Fw 44. The workshops produced a number of original designs, some of these were produced (DAR 1, DAR 3, DAR 4, DAR 6, DAR 9, DAR 11), while others never proceeded past prototype stage (DAR 5, DAR 7, DAR 10).

Although aircraft manufacture was moved to the Darzhavna Samoletna Fabrika (Държавна самолетна фабрика - State Airplane Factory, abbr. ДСФ - DSF) in Lovech in 1940, designers remained in DAR.  was DAR's head designer towards the end of the organisation's lifespan. Amongst others, he was responsible for its final design, the DAR 11 fighter of 1941 that never left the drawing board. DAR was closed after 1945 and the personnel and facilities were moved to the DSF in Lovech.

Although not direct legal successor, in 1995 a newly established private company called Aeroplani DAR based its name and heritage on DAR.

Products

See also 
 State Aircraft Factory (Bulgaria)

References

Footnotes

Notes

Bibliography

External links

 Romanian Military History Forum: Bulgarian Aircraft Production (1910-1945) – includes pictures of a magazine article with production lists

Aircraft manufacturers of Bulgaria
Government-owned companies of Bulgaria
Defunct manufacturing companies of Bulgaria
Manufacturing companies established in 1924
1924 establishments in Bulgaria